Willamette Block is an historic building in Portland, Oregon. The 1882 structures is part of the Portland Yamhill Historic District, which is listed on the National Register of Historic Places.

External links
 
 Willamette Block at Emporis

1882 establishments in Oregon
Buildings and structures completed in 1882
Buildings and structures in Portland, Oregon
Southwest Portland, Oregon